Nyimas Shandy Aulia or better known as Shandy Aulia (born in Jakarta, Indonesia on June 23, 1987) is an Indonesian actress and model of mixed Minahasan, Palembang and Minangkabau descent.

Career
Shandy's popularity started with her role as Tita in the movie Eiffel I'm in Love. In this film, she was paired with actor Samuel Rizal, who later became her boyfriend. The couple also starred in the movie Apa Artinya Cinta?. After a while, Shandy was rarely heard of. It turns out that she was busy with college and was taking care of her only child. Although Shandy is not married, she has an adopted son who 5 years old, named Reinhary Samuel Robert.

While Shandy appears on movies more often than TV, it doesn't mean she's not interested in soap operas. She prefers portraying characters she can relate with, one of the namely Hareem, a soap opera which aired on Indosiar. Her appearance on the television screen can also be enjoyed through the soap Mendadak Kawin.

In 2015, Shandy was back starring in the controversial film, Tarot, as Julia/Sofie and appeared in the video clip in Boy William' "Stranger In My Bed", a soundtrack for same film. In addition to her acting career, Shandy also penetrated the fashion business, namely SA Collection. Her fashion business targets fashionable young women. Shandy admitted that SA Collection is not new business but has already been maintained for a long time.

Personal life
Shandy is the youngest child of four siblings. Their parents are Kemas Yusuf Effendy, a Muslim and Elsye Dopong, a Christian. Her father is from Palembang, while her mother is from Manado. At the age of 3, her parents divorced. Shandy joined with her mother, while her three eldest sisters, lived with their father.

After a failed relationship with actor Roger Danuarta, Shandy later on had a romantic relationship with Samuel Rizal, her co-star in the film Eiffel I'm in Love. But their relationship also eventually ended.

Shandy almost got married. Although the wedding preparations have been completed in November 2010, Shandy failed to be married to Dave Laksono, a son of minister Agung Laksono. The ceremony was supposed to take place on December 18, 2010, but was cancelled due to differences in religion. On December 12, 2011, Shandy suddenly married David Herbowo, a man of Chinese descent, who was the son of a businessman. Their wedding was held in a chapel of the Church in Bali. Her father, Kemas Yusuf Effendi, did not attend the event.

Controversy

Alludes statement about fashion
Just recently, Shandy had decided to shift her focus to the world of fashion. When invited to be a guest star in the program, Ada Ada Aja, Shandy elaborated about the business she is currently doing. Shandy discusses a series of celebrity fashion designers, like Laudya Cynthia Bella, Nikita Willy, Syahrini and Bella Shofie. Shandy commented that Bella's display dress 'butterfly' in the Red Carpet of the 2014 Global Seru Awards was considered inappropriate.

Knowing her name quipped, Bella became offended by the statement. Through her Path account, Bella vent her anger towards Shandy with profanities and uploaded Shandy's photo news about her:

Apparently, the news about Bella's anger finally reached Shandy' ears. Of the unwillingness to drag the problem further, Shandy wrote a clarification statement on her official Instagram account, saying:

Shandy insisted that she had no ill intentions at all over the commentary about Bella's fashion. But to end the misunderstanding, she apologized if what she said offended the concerned party.

Bella could not be reached for her comment related to the apology from Shandy. Bella's assistant, Datuk, was not willing to give a statement and said: "Bella is still filming the soap opera, Rajawali and she is not able to give a comment at the moment." In addition, Bella's manager, Tata Liem, also did not want to give a statement.

Filmography

Film

Television

Television film
 Cewek Cantik Itu Namanya Sarah (2008)
 Mengejar Cinta Nayla (2008)
 Siapa Bilang Cinta Itu Buta (2009)
 Buaya Pesta (2009)
 Sekotak Pisang Ponti Untuk Cinta (2009)
 Cewek, Maafin Gue Donk (2009)
 He Loves Me, He Loves Me Not (2009)
 Miscall (2009)
 Pacar Gue Sexy Banget (2009)
 Piring Terbang (2009)
 Tabrak Lari (2009)
 Tabrak Lari 2 (2009)
 Asyiknya Jadi Cewek Tajir (2009)

Book
 Incomplete (2014)

Video Clip

TV commercials

References

External links
  
 

Indonesian actresses
Indonesian film actresses
Indonesian television actresses
People from Jakarta
Minahasa people
Indonesian people of Malay descent
People from Palembang
1987 births
Living people
Moroccan people of Malay descent
Saudi Arabian people of Malay descent